Bade District is a district in the central part of Taoyuan City, Taiwan (Republic of China.) It is the smallest district by area in Taoyuan City.

History
Bade City was originally established as Bakuaicuo (八塊厝) during Qing Dynasty rule. During the period of Japanese rule, it was called Hachitoku Village (八塊庄), and was governed under Tōen District (桃園郡) of Shinchiku Prefecture.

After the handover of Taiwan from Japan to the Republic of China, the area was established as a rural township and named Bade Township in 1946. In 1995, it was upgraded as a county-administered city named Bade City. On 25 December 2014, it became Bade District.

Geography
Area: 
Population: 210,639 (February 2023)

Administrative divisions
The district comprises 48 villages: Bailu, Daai, Daan, Dachang, Dacheng, Dafa, Dafu, Dahan, Dahe, Dahong, Dahua, Dajiang, Daming, Danan, Daqian, Daqing, Daren, Darong, Dashun, Datong, Daxin, Daxing, Dayi, Dayong, Dazheng, Dazhi, Dazhong, Dazhu, Fuxing, Gaocheng, Gaoming, Guangde, Guanglong, Guangxing, Jiadong, Jiaming, Liuguang, Longyou, Ruide, Ruifa, Ruifeng, Ruitai, Ruixiang, Ruixing, Xiaoli, Xingren, Yongfeng and Zhuyuan.

Education
 National Defense University
 Yung-Feng High School
 Ba-de Junior High School
 Da-Cheng Junior High School
 Cha-Dong Elementary School
 Da-Yun Elementary School
Bade Elementary School

Tourist attractions

 Arts Square
 Bade Pond Ecological Park
 Fengshujiao Leisure Park
 Guangfong First Park
 Republic of Chocolate
 Sunshine Life Park

Transportation
Bade is served by National Freeway 2.

Notable natives
 Chao Cheng-yu, member of Legislative Yuan
 Cheng Wen-tsan, Mayor of Taoyuan City
 Eric Chu, Mayor of New Taipei City (2016–2018)

References

External links
 
  

Districts of Taoyuan City